is a Buddhist temple belonging to the Kōyasan Shingon sect located in the city of Obama, Fukui, Japan. Its main image is a  statue of Amida Nyōrai.

History
The temple was originally named  and appears in historical records only from 1265, although its foundation appears to have been much older. It converted from the Tendai sect to the Shingon sect during the Ōan period (1368-1374) and was renamed . During the Sengoku period, it was sponsored by the Takeda clan and in 1544 Takeda Nobutomo granted it a charter as a refuge for women who were abused by their husbands. The temple was destroyed during the battles of the Genki period (1570-1573). After its restoration in 1602, it was renamed Mantoku-ji. In 1677, Sakai Tadanao, daimyo of Obama Domain under the Tokugawa shogunate ordered that the temple be relocated from its original site on the banks of the Otonashi River to its present location in the mountains.

Cultural Properties

Important cultural properties

Amida Nyōrai
The statue has a height of 141.5 cm. It was designed an Important Cultural Property of Japan on August 20, 1913.

Fudo Myō-ō
It is 113.7 cm long by 61.2 cm side. It was designated an Important Cultural Property of Japan on June 6, 1985

Miroku Bosatsu
The scroll has dimensions of 93.1 cm by 52.7 cm and dates from the mid-Kamakura period. It was designed an Important Cultural Property of Japan on August 2, 1901.

National Place of Scenic Beauty

Mantoku-ji gardens
The Japanese garden at Mantoku-ji covers 1500 square meters and combines elements of Japanese rock garden with ponds and tree arrangements. The garden was created in 1677, as is regarded as a typical example of early Edo period design. It became a nationally designated Place of Scenic Beauty on March 25, 1932.

National Natural Monument

Mantoku-ji Oyama Momiji
It has a circumference of 3.6 meters at its base. It has been protected as a National Natural Monument since June 6, 1931.

See also
List of Places of Scenic Beauty of Japan (Fukui)

References

External links

Obama city official site 
 Fukui Tourist Information site 

Buddhist temples in Fukui Prefecture
Obama, Fukui
Kōyasan Shingon temples
Wakasa Province
Places of Scenic Beauty